Pulte may refer to:

Joseph Hippolyt Pulte (1811–1884), German-American homeopathic physician
PulteGroup, an American home construction company
Bill Pulte (1932–2018), founder and former chairman of Pulte Homes

See also
Lag Prau Pulté, a lake in Switzerland
Plute (disambiguation)